Sikhism is a minority religion in South Korea. Sikhs have been in South Korea for 50 years. Early Sikh pioneers came to the country  as traders and businessmen. The first South Korean gurdwara was established in 2001. There are about 550 Sikhs in South Korea, now recently the Sikhs in South were allowed to acquire South Korean citizenship.

There is only one Sikh Gurudwara in South Korea, "GURDWARA SRI SINGH SABHA SAHIB, SOUTH KOREA". It is located at Idonggyo-ri, Sohol-eup, Pocheon-si which is in the Gyeonggi-do province of South Korea.

References
3. Abeet Paul Singh(March 6, 2020).

Sikhism by country
Religion in South Korea